Gymnarion is a genus of air-breathing land snails, terrestrial pulmonate gastropod mollusks or micromollusks in the family Urocyclidae.

Species
Species within the genus Gymnarion include:
 Gymnarion aloysiisabaudiae (Pollonera, 1906)
 Gymnarion apertus E. Binder, 1979
 Gymnarion bequaerti E. Binder, 1979
 Gymnarion cheranganiensis Connolly, 1925
 Gymnarion chinegris E. Binder, 1979
 Gymnarion chirindicus E. Binder, 1981
 Gymnarion corneola (Morelet, 1867)
 Gymnarion gomesiana (Morelet, 1867)
 Gymnarion masukuensis (E. A. Smith, 1899)
 Gymnarion medjensis Pilsbry, 1919
 Gymnarion nyasanus (E.A. Smith, 1899)
 Gymnarion tanganyicae (E. von Martens, 1895)
 Gymnarion upembae E. Binder, 1979
 Gymnarion vumbae E. Binder, 1981
 Gymnarion wittei E. Binder, 1979
Taxon inquirendum
 Gymnarion grandis (Beck)
Species brought into synonymy
 Gymnarion (Lacrimarion) lacrimosus Connolly, 1929 : synonym of Lacrimarion lacrimosus (Connolly, 1929) (superseded combination)
 Gymnarion aloysii-sabaudiae (Pollonera, 1906) : synonym of Gymnarion aloysiisabaudiae (Pollonera, 1906) (incorrect original spelling)
 Gymnarion lacrimosus Connolly, 1929 : synonym of Lacrimarion lacrimosus (Connolly, 1929) (original combination)

References

 Bank, R. A. (2017). Classification of the Recent terrestrial Gastropoda of the World. Last update: July 16th, 2017

External links
 Pilsbry, H.A. (1919). A review of the land mollusks of the Belgian Congo chiefly based on the collections of the American Museum Congo Expedition, 1909-1915. Bulletin of the American Museum of Natural History, 40: 1-370, pls I-XXIII

Urocyclidae